Sigismund III Vasa (20 June 1566 – 30 April 1632 
N.S.) was King of Poland and Grand Duke of Lithuania from 1587 to 1632 and, as Sigismund, King of Sweden and Grand Duke of Finland from 1592 to 1599. He was the first Polish sovereign from the House of Vasa. Religiously zealous, he imposed Roman Catholicism across the vast realm, and his crusades against neighbouring states marked Poland's largest territorial expansion. As an enlightened despot, he presided over an era of prosperity and achievement, further distinguished by the transfer of the country's capital from Kraków to Warsaw.

Sigismund was the son of King John III of Sweden and his first wife, Catherine Jagiellon, daughter of King Sigismund I of Poland. Elected monarch of the Polish–Lithuanian Commonwealth in 1587, he sought to unify Poland and Sweden under one Catholic kingdom, and when he succeeded his deceased father in 1592 the Polish–Swedish union was created. Opposition in Protestant Sweden caused a war against Sigismund headed by Sigismund's uncle Charles IX, who deposed him in 1599.

Sigismund attempted to hold absolute power in all his dominions and frequently undermined parliament. He suppressed internal opposition, strengthened Catholic influence and granted privileges to the Jesuits, whom he employed as advisors and spies during the Counter-Reformation. He actively interfered in the affairs of neighbouring countries; his invasion of Russia during the Time of Troubles resulted in brief control over Moscow and seizure of Smolensk. Sigismund's army also defeated the Ottoman forces in southeastern Europe, which hastened the downfall of Sultan Osman II. However, the Polish–Swedish conflict had a less favourable outcome. After a series of skirmishes ending in a truce, King Gustavus Adolphus of Sweden launched a campaign against the Commonwealth and annexed parts of Polish Livonia.

Sigismund remains a controversial figure in Poland. One of the country's most recognisable monarchs, his long reign coincided with the Polish Golden Age, the apex in the prestige, power and economic influence of the Polish–Lithuanian Commonwealth. On the other hand, it was also during his rule that the seeds of decline surfaced. Considerable contributions to the arts and architecture as well as military victories were tarnished by intrigues and religious persecutions. He was commemorated in Warsaw by Sigismund's Column, one of the city's chief landmarks and the first secular monument in the form of a column in modern history. It was commissioned after Sigismund's death by his son and successor, Władysław IV.

Early life

Born on 20 June 1566 at Gripsholm Castle, Sigismund was the second child and only son of Catherine Jagiellon and Grand Duke John of Finland. The couple was being held prisoner at Gripsholm since 1563 when John staged a failed rebellion against his deranged brother Eric XIV of Sweden. Although Protestant Christians were growing political wing in Poland at the time, Sigismund was raised as a Roman Catholic. His mother Catherine was the daughter of Polish king Sigismund the Old and Bona Sforza of Milan, all of whom where practicing Catholics. Sigismund's older sister Isabella died aged two in 1566. His younger sister Anna was a Lutheran, but the close relationship between the two siblings remained unchanged until her death in 1625.

In October 1567, Sigismund and his parents were released from prison at the request of his uncle Charles. In January 1569, Eric XIV was deposed and Sigismund's father ascended the throne of Sweden as John III. He maintained good relations with his father despite John's second marriage to Gunilla Bielke, a Protestant noble lady of lower status and Catherine's former maid of honour. In 1589, Sigismund's half-brother John, the future Duke of Östergötland, was born.

As a child, Sigismund was tutored in both Polish and Swedish, thus making him bilingual. He was also proficient in German, Italian, and Latin. Catherine ensured that her son was educated in the spirit of Catholicism and Polish patriotism; the young prince was made aware of his blood connection to the Jagiellonian dynasty which ruled Poland in its finest period for two hundred years. Although Sigismund in his youth enjoyed reading and learning, observers did not acknowledge his intelligence. He was handsome, rather tall, and of slim build, but timid and an introvert who became heavily influenced by the teachings of the church. Nevertheless, Sigismund was undoubtedly multitalented and artistically inclined.

Accession

In 1587, Sigismund stood for election to the Polish throne after the death of Stephen Báthory. His candidacy was secured by Queen Dowager Anna and several elite magnates who considered him a native candidate as a descendant of the Jagiellons, though the election was openly questioned and opposed by the nobles politically associated with the Zborowski family. With the blessing of primate Stanisław Karnkowski and strong support from other people of influence he was duly elected ruler of the Polish–Lithuanian Commonwealth on 19 August 1587. His official name and title became "by the grace of God, king of Poland, grand duke of Lithuania, ruler of Ruthenia, Prussia, Masovia, Samogitia, Livonia and also hereditary king of the Swedes, Goths and Wends"; the latter titles being a reference to the fact that he was already the Crown Prince of Sweden, and thus would lawfully succeed to the throne of Sweden upon the death of his father.

The outcome of the election was strongly contested by factions of the Polish nobility that backed the candidacy of Archduke Maximilian III of Austria, who launched a military expedition. When the news reached Sigismund in Sweden, he crossed the Baltic and landed in Poland on 7 October, immediately agreeing to grant royal privileges to the Sejm (parliament) in the hope of calming the opposition and settling the disputed election. He was proclaimed king by Treasurer Jan Dulski on behalf of Crown Marshal Andrzej Opaliński, and after arriving in the Royal Capital City of Kraków he was crowned on 27 December at Wawel Cathedral.

Sigismund's position was solidified when Zamoyski defeated Maximilian at the Battle of Byczyna and took him prisoner. At the request of Pope Sixtus V, the Archduke was then released and in turn surrendered his claim to Poland in 1589. He was also successful in maintaining peace with his powerful southern neighbour by marrying Archduchess Anne of Habsburg in 1592. Simultaneously, he secured an alliance with Catholic Austria against Protestant foes.

When his father died, Sigismund was granted permission by the Polish Diet to claim the Swedish crown, which he had inherited from his father. The Swedes, who previously declared John III a Catholic conspirator and traitor, became lenient when the new monarch pledged to respect Lutheranism as the country's new state religion. Sigismund was crowned at Uppsala on 19 February 1594, but his promise to uphold the Protestant faith in Sweden began on shaky ground, as demonstrated by the presence of a papal nuncio in the royal procession. Tensions grew following his coronation. Sigismund remained a devout Roman Catholic and left the country abruptly, which made the Swedes sceptical of their new ruler. After returning to Poland, he appointed his uncle, Duke Charles, to rule as his regent. Sigismund's ultimate intention was to reinstate Catholicism in Sweden, by force if necessary. The Jesuits often acted as agents refuting Protestantism and promoting Catholicism in the country.

Opposition

The hostility between Chancellor Jan Zamoyski and Sigismund began as soon as he arrived in Poland from Sweden to claim the crown. Zamoyski, a patriotic brawler, along with other magnates were critical of the young king's liking for the Habsburg culture, certain habits and impassive cold character. According to historian and writer Julian Ursyn Niemcewicz, Zamoyski was said to have exclaimed "what a mute have you brought to us" upon meeting the king in October 1587. The Chancellor was initially supportive of Sigismund's candidacy due to his maternal lineage. During the first parliament sitting, the so-called Pacification Sejm, in March 1589, Zamoyski proposed extensive reforms of the electoral system; notably, he presented the idea that only a member of a local native dynasty should be eligible to the Polish throne in the future, entailing the permanent exclusion of any Habsburg candidates.

Sigismund saw a potential ally in Austria; he sought to establish a Catholic league that would actively engage in the Counter-Reformation. Zamoyski openly condemned Sigismund for associating with the Habsburgs, particularly Archduke Ernest, and speculated that Ernest was to be the potential successor if Sigismund abdicated and returned to Sweden. The anti-Austrian sentiment was only explicable as a circuitous attempt to traverse the Habsburg hegemony and influence in Central Europe, which Zamoyski perceived as a major threat. However, the parliament immediately rejected the proposal and ruled in favour of Austria, thus also accepting a marriage between Sigismund and Anne of Habsburg. Furthermore, the reestablishment of peaceful relations with Austria was dictated by the Treaty of Bytom and Będzin from March 1589 which was negotiated by Ippolito Aldobrandini, future Pope Clement VIII.

At the subsequent Sejm session, assembled in March 1590, Zamoyski persuaded the gathered deputies and representatives to exclude Archduke Maximilian from future candidacy to the throne, describing the possibility of  Austrian intrigues and the looming threat of the Turkish Empire. His opponents, headed by Primate Karnkowski, formed an informal confederation immediately after the Sejm rose to protest the decrees. All of the decrees of the first Sejm were rescinded by a second Sejm which sat at the end of the same year: the Hetmanship was suspended, the party of Maximilian was amnestied, the Zborowskis were rehabilitated, and Zamoyski's counterparts were removed from the royal court. Tensions grew further over the ownership of Estonia between Sweden and Poland following the dissolution of the Livonian Order; Zamoyski held Sigismund accountable for the dispute.

Sigismund's leniency towards the Habsburgs also alienated some clerics; the Austrians wanted to prevent Andrew Báthory from seizing the bishopric of Kraków and succeeded in doing so by diplomatic coaxing or coercion. The new papal nuncio, Annibale di Capua, a staunch Habsburg supporter, eventually convinced Sigismund to nominate Jerzy Radziwiłł after Piotr Myszkowski died on 5 April 1591. Capua stressed that Andrew had not been an ordained priest and was not legally capable to become bishop. The decision strained the once friendly relations between Poland and Transylvania.

Peace settlement

As outlined by Oskar Halecki, the king's friends were largely recruited from the higher clergy and the Jesuits, who violated the 1573 Warsaw Confederation guaranteeing religious freedoms in Poland and Lithuania. As persecution loomed, political dissidents grouped and formed factions which called for adherence to the laws of the Confederation. Zamoyski joined the dissidents, and, when Sigismund failed to prevent mob violence directed against non-Catholics in Vilnius and Kraków in 1591, he summoned several conventions that "demanded the guarantees of security". Sigismund yielded to their demands, however, he forbade any future conventions which could destabilize the state. The prohibition did not have a lasting effect, and gatherings of dissidents continued in the following year.

The opposition hoped to thwart the match with Archduchess Anne of Habsburg, whose state entry into Kraków at the end of May was greatly celebrated. Sigismund disregarded any protest in regards to the marriage. Consequently, on 1 June 1592 Zamoyski formed another confederation at Jędrzejów (Latin: Andreiow) attended by the most eminent and distinguished magnates, among them Mikołaj Zebrzydowski and Stanisław Żółkiewski. At Andreiow, he allegedly exposed proof concerning a plot that would place Archduke Ernest on the throne if Sigismund was to abdicate. Zamoyski's claim caused an uproar.

On 7 September, Sigismund summoned the "Warsaw Inquisition Sejm" (sejm inkwizycyjny) to inquire into the so-called "Austrian cabals". Zamoyski's strong argument against that of the monarch was so persuasive that elderly Karnkowski sided with the Chancellor and his supporters, who abstained from kissing the King's hand upon arrival as the custom required. Alleged letters and private correspondence between Sigismund and Ernest with the royal signature was presented as evidence. The King rebuked these accusations; his aides attributed the falsified signature to the court scribe, who was subsequently imprisoned at Działdowo (Soldau), tortured, but pleaded not guilty. The opposition extended their demands and asked for the immediate removal of all foreign dignitaries from the court, including mercenaries, which was not fully enforced.

The Sejm had no definite outcome; most of the gathered nobles and diplomats dispersed as further incrimination of the sovereign proved futile and detrimental to the stability of the state. There is little evidence or written works from the period concerning the terms under which the Sejm functioned or how it concluded. Niemcewicz largely attributed the victory to Sigismund – the measures of the Counter-Reformation strengthened and within a year many of the convention's attendees died; acquiescent nobles favourable to the king were appointed as their successors, thus making his position less vulnerable. The rivalry between Sigismund and Zamoyski continued until the latter's death in 1605.

War in Sweden

Tensions

The Uppsala Resolution of 1594 dictated the rights and securities of Protestants in Sweden; it promised to uphold the Lutheran faith in the country, forbade non-Lutherans from being appointed to office or participating in the educational system and prevented Sigismund from freely raising taxes for war. However, the resolution was undermined whenever possible. With military backing, Sigismund installed his own commanders in Swedish castles and made them responsible directly to him. He established the office of regional governor (ståthållare) and appointed Charles' lifelong enemy, Klaus Fleming, as the overlord of Finland. The governors served notice that they would abstain from persecuting Catholicism in their administered territories. Erik Brahe, a Roman Catholic, became the governor of Sweden's capital city, Stockholm, in defiance of the 1594 charter which sparked widespread anger.

On 4 August 1594 Sigismund decreed that the Swedish parliament (Riksdag) had no right to function without royal consent. Despite this, Charles summoned a parliament at Söderköping in autumn of 1595, at which he declared himself regent and head of government, who would govern Sweden reciprocally with the Privy Council during the King's absence from the realm. The Finnish nobility led by Fleming rejected this resolution and so did Sigismund's emissary who ordered him, in the name of the king, to resign. Fleming sympathised with Sigismund and considered Charles a rebel. In response, Charles instigated a brief revolt against Fleming among the peasants under Jaakko Ilkka in the province of Ostrobothnia, known today as the Cudgel War.

As outlined by historian Gary Dean Peterson, Fleming might have quelled the rebellion but it was Charles who took advantage of the brutality of Fleming's men and started a successful propaganda war. The prospects of Polish and Catholic domination over Sweden became uncertain when Klaus Fleming died on 13 April 1597. He was succeeded by Arvid Stålarm the Younger, who did not accede to Swedish demands and awaited Charles' intervention in Finland. Meanwhile, the nobility dispersed; Erik Gustafsson Stenbock, Arvid Gustafsson Stenbock, Erik Larsson Sparre, Erik Brahe and Sten Banér fled to entreat Sigismund to return and counter Charles.

Civil war

In 1597, a civil war erupted and Duke Charles was able to assume control over a large share of the powerful castles in Sweden, and in this manner achieved control over almost all the realm. However, Finland remained loyal to Sigismund and resisted. In September 1597, he sailed for the Finnish coast and seized Åbo Castle from Fleming's widow, Ebba Stenbock, by the end of the month. Charles's troops were not prepared nor strong enough to conquer or hold Finland in its entirety – they sailed back to Stockholm in October and Stålarm retook Åbo the same year.

As noted by envoys, several high-ranking noblemen fighting for Sigismund's cause were instantaneously sent to the scaffold. Further tensions and escalation of violence as well as Charles's unpredictable stance persuaded Sigismund to intervene. Christian IV of Denmark agreed to cooperate but would not join the armed conflict. The major seaports of Danzig (Gdańsk), Lübeck and Rostock were pressured to sever trade with Sweden. Polish privateers began to violently attack Swedish vessels in the Baltic. By February 1598 Sigismund assembled an army consisting of approximately 5,000 men. On 23 July 1598 the army left Danzig (Gdańsk) with eighty transports, several warships and exiled members of the Swedish parliament. Eight days later they landed in Kalmar, which surrendered without a fight.

After the fall of Kalmar, Charles found himself with major trouble on his hands; the Polish Crown army attracted Swedish followers, and Stockholm, lacking military defence, was easily taken with the help of the nobility and officers of Götaland. The cavalry of Uppland soon joined the royalists, and new forces were mobilised in Finland and Estonia. Charles' troops were greater in numbers, but mostly comprised poorly-trained militias and peasants from the friendly provinces.

Sigismund advanced his troops towards Stångebro in Linköping where his sister Anna Vasa resided. On 8 September Charles executed a premature attack on Stångebro which was quickly repelled; his force was surrounded in the night and massacred by the Poles. Severed heads on lances and spikes startled Sigismund who ordered an end to the violence. The supposed truce did not come into effect, and, on the morning of 25 September, the armies clashed once more in a major engagement at the Battle of Stångebro. The prevailing fog was instrumental at hiding troop movement; the Swedish rebels used the opportunity to take the bridges on the river Stångån when Sigismund's men were falsely led into a truce and retreated to their camp. Their attempt to regroup and form a second defensive line proved futile and Charles emerged victorious as the Polish army was also cut off from supplies by superior Swedish warships.

Aftermath and deposition

The peace agreement was sealed with a dinner at Linköping Castle on 28 September. Both sides agreed to lay down arms and send the troops back to their home provinces, except for the King's personal guard. Charles' appointments were to be recognized and a parliament was to be called to settle any disputes. The King, who was under pressure, fearing for his life without his army and having realised that he had lost the political battle, fled with his sister during the coming days to Poland. At the same time as the peace treaty was being signed in Linköping, conflicts were taking place in Dalarna. There, a pro-Sigismund bailiff, Jacob Näf, had tried to raise up the Dalecarlians against Duke Charles. Chaos ensued, Näf was executed, and the Dalecarlians set out on a campaign in 1598, burning and killing down to Brunnbäck ferry. In Västergötland, Carl Carlsson Gyllenhielm, illegitimate son of Duke Charles, defeated the rebellion. A number of Swedes who had sided with Sigismund, including his council supporters, were handed over to Charles as part of the peace settlement. They were later killed in the Linköping Bloodbath of 1600.

Sigismund was officially deposed from the throne of Sweden by a Riksdag held in Stockholm on 24 July 1599. He was given six (or twelve depending on source) months to send his son, Prince Ladislaus (Władysław) Vasa, to Sweden as his successor, under the condition that the boy would be brought up in the Protestant faith. In February 1600, Duke Charles summoned the Estates of the Realm to Linköping. Since Sigismund had not provided a reply, the Estates elected Duke Charles as King apparent, however he would not become Charles IX until his coronation four years later. During the winter and spring of 1600, Charles also occupied the Swedish part of Estonia, as the castle commanders had shown sympathies towards Sigismund.

Polish affairs

Clash with England (1597)

In the 1590s, the interests of the English and the Ottoman Turks coincided in opposing the Spanish; on the other hand, Sigismund had clashed with the Turks in Poland's southeast. In the Low Countries of northwestern Europe, Protestant forces sent by Elizabeth I fought the Catholic armies of Spain's Philip II Habsburg, preventing Spain from capturing territory on the south side of the English Channel. England's naval power also prevented Spain from completely dominating the Mediterranean, to the benefit of the Turks. During this time, England purchased a great deal of grain and timber from Poland to supply its navy, necessitating good relations with Poland. Edward Barton, Elizabeth's ambassador to the Ottoman Empire, had warned them that England would have to respond if the Ottomans invaded Poland.

In July 1597, the Queen's Privy Council instructed Henry Billingsley, Lord Mayor of London, to arrange housing for a Polish diplomat and report back to the Council. On 23 July, Paweł Działyński arrived in London and was accommodated at the house of Sir John Spencer. On 25 July, Działyński was granted an audience with Elizabeth and her court at the palace in Greenwich. As described by Robert Cecil, 1st Earl of Salisbury, the ambassador out of Poland at first seemed to be "a gentleman of excellent fashion, wit, discourse, language, and person." He presented his credentials, kissed the Queen's hand, then walked to the centre of the chamber and, as outlined by Cecil, "began his oration aloud in Latin, with such a gallant countenance as in my life I never beheld."

Działyński informed Elizabeth that Sigismund was outraged that her vessels were capturing the ships of Polish and Hanseatic merchants trading with the Spanish, and indicated that Sigismund was prepared to commence hostilities over the matter unless Elizabeth immediately rescinded this policy and returned captured ships and cargo.

Elizabeth rose "lionlike" and rebuked Działyński, comparing his speech to a declaration of war and manners to that of "a herald than an ambassador." She reminded him that England was instrumental in halting the Turkish advances and added "I can hardly believe that if the King [Sigismund] himself were present he would have used such language." Sigismund emerged successful in securing trade with the Spanish Crown and with England, though the relations between the two nations became strained. According to historians Kavita Mudan Finn and Valerie Schutte, William Shakespeare might have used Elizabeth's political anger at the Polish ambassador as an inspiration for Queen Margaret who employs similar strategies in the play Richard III.

Zebrzydowski rebellion (1606)

Sigismund's attempt to grasp unlimited authority resulted in the Zebrzydowski rebellion, an armed insurrection formed in 1606 by Hetman Mikołaj Zebrzydowski, Jan Szczęsny Herburt, Stanisław Stadnicki, Aleksander Józef Lisowski and Prince Janusz Radziwiłł in Stężyca and Lublin. It was primarily caused by the growing dissatisfaction with the monarch among the Polish szlachta and wealthy magnates. The rebels disapproved of Sigismund's efforts to weaken the diplomatic and political capabilities of the nobility and to introduce an absolute monarchy.

The participants of the rebellion formed a war council and outlined their demands in 67 articles. They demanded the dethronement of Sigismund for breaching the Henrician Articles and stipulated the expulsion of Jesuits from the Polish–Lithuanian Commonwealth. The Sejm was to be granted the authority of appointing state officials instead of the King, local officials were to be elected and the rights of Protestants expanded. The 1607 Parliament rejected these conditions. Meanwhile, the nobles mobilised in the village of Guzów. In 1607 the Polish Royal Army, led by Hetman Jan Karol Chodkiewicz, was sent to pacify the rebels. A full-scale battle ensued on 5 July, with 200 casualties, which resulted in the victory of the Royalist forces.

The rebellious nobles formally surrendered to the King at the 1609 meeting of the parliament, which became known as the Pacification Sejm. In return for their surrender the rebels were granted leniency. Many royal supporters, including Hetman Chodkiewicz, had exacted amnesty for the rebels. Despite the failure to overthrow Sigismund, the rebellion firmly established the rights and privileges of nobles in the Polish political system, confirmed the inviolability of the royal elections and religious tolerance.

Sigismund's invasion of Russia (1609–1618)

Sigismund's major goals were achieving stability of government, combating Protestantism, and expanding Poland's territory. While the Russians were embroiled in a civil war known as the Time of Troubles, Sigismund saw an opportunity to invade Russia and take power. Sweden also became involved, but never made a firm alliance with any one side.

Background

The death of Feodor I of Russia in 1598 caused internal instability and a succession crisis upon the extinction of the Rurik dynasty. Further setbacks that contributed to the escalation of violence was the famine of 1601–1603 which killed two million Russians, around a third of the population. The new Tsar, Boris Godunov, proved to be an ineffective ruler and died after suffering a brain haemorrhage in April 1605. He left one son, Feodor II, who succeeded him and ruled for only a few months, until he and Godunov's widow were murdered under mysterious circumstances in June 1605, possibly on Sigismund's orders. Simultaneously, various impostors and pretenders to the Russian throne appeared claiming to be Dmitry Ivanovich, the youngest son of Ivan the Terrible who in fact died in 1591. After the fall of Sigismund's candidates – False Dmitry I and his Polish wife Marina Mniszech (nicknamed "Marinka the Witch" by the Russians) – Vasili Ivanovich Shuysky was crowned as Vasili IV.

The death of False Dmitry and widespread chaos proved reason for Poland to prepare an invasion. Prior raids between 1605 and 1609 were conducted by Polish nobles or adventurers along with hired cossacks and foreign mercenaries. Sigismund's primary intention was to destroy the Russian state and impose Catholicism with the use of force or terror if necessary. Lew Sapieha, Grand Chancellor of Lithuania, sought neutrality by proposing to Boris Godunov an "eternal" peace treaty between Russia and Poland–Lithuania, but the idea did not gain support and was declined.

Campaign

The Commonwealth army under the command of Hetman Stanisław Żółkiewski crossed the border and on 29 September 1609 laid siege to Smolensk. On 4 July 1610, at the Battle of Klushino, the outnumbered Polish force achieved a decisive victory over Russian troops, mostly due to the tactical competence of the Polish winged hussars. The battle was a major blow to the Russians; Tsar Vasili IV was subsequently ousted by the Seven Boyars and Żółkiewski entered Moscow beginning the two-year tyrannical occupation of the Kremlin. The Seven Boyars proclaimed Polish prince Ladislaus, Sigismund's son, as the new Tsar of Russia. In June 1611 Smolensk fell to the Poles; the deposed Vasili Shuysky was transported in a caged wagon to Warsaw, where he paid tribute to Sigismund and the Senate at the Royal Castle on 29 October 1611. He eventually died in captivity at Gostynin; he was most likely poisoned as his brother died soon after. The Polish army also committed countless atrocities while stationing in Moscow.

In 1611, Kuzma Minin and Dmitry Pozharsky formed a new army to launch an uprising against the Polish occupiers. The Poles eventually withdrew from Moscow in September 1612 after pillaging and burning the city. When news reached Sigismund he hurried with a relief force, but was unable to commence an attack. The war continued with little military action until 1618 when the Truce of Deulino was signed, which granted Poland new territories, including the city of Smolensk. The agreement marked the greatest geographical expansion of the Polish–Lithuanian Commonwealth until the loss of Livonia in 1629. However, Russia was able to retain independence and Michael Romanov was crowned Tsar in 1613. This established the Romanov dynasty which ruled Russia until the February Revolution in 1917. Sigismund's personal ambition of ruling the vast lands in the east as well as converting its populace to Catholicism ended in a fiasco. According to Alexander Gillespie, approximately five million Russians died between 1598 and 1613, the result of continuous conflict, civil war, instigated famine and Sigismund's politics.

Thirty Years' War (1618–1648)

Sigismund sought to join the Catholic side of the Thirty Years' War, but was denied by the Polish parliament. British historian Robert Nisbet Bain wrote that his plan was to invade and possibly occupy Transylvania, then an Ottoman ally and therefore considered dangerous to the Habsburg monarchy and Poland. The Rákóczis and Gabriel Bethlen were sympathetic with the Sultan and would counterattack if the opportunity arose.

Bain further highlighted that the chief pillars of military strength in Poland, including Stanisław Żółkiewski, warmly approved of the King's policy in this respect, but it proved to be impracticable. The parliament's non-interventionist stance went so far that it refused to grant any subsidies for the Swedish Wars. The indecision and political opposition weakened the alliance between the Habsburg states and the Commonwealth. Polish mercenaries did, however, join the Holy Roman Empire in combat at the Battle of Humenné against Transylvania.

Polish–Ottoman War (1620–1621)

The Principality of Moldavia was a Polish fief since the Middle Ages and Sigismund aimed at securing that despite the growing threat from the south. With the Ottoman influence on the rise, the Sultan aimed at expanding the Ottoman Empire westward. The Ottoman–Habsburg wars, which lasted almost two centuries, were also a sign of the Sultan's desire to rule mainland Europe. Voivode Gaspar Graziani, ruler of Moldavia, decided to switch sides in favour of Poland and rebelled against the Turks. In turn, Sigismund sent an army to aid Graziani, a move which sparked the Polish–Ottoman War.

In 1620 the Polish forces were defeated at Cecora and Hetman Żółkiewski perished during the battle. In 1621 a strong army of Ottomans, led by Osman II, advanced from Edirne towards the Polish frontier. Approximately 160,000 men besieged the Khotyn Fortress in September 1621, but were defeated at the Battle of Khotyn by a Polish garrison counting no more than 50,000 soldiers. During the siege Hetman Jan Karol Chodkiewicz died of exhaustion and illness in the camp.

The Treaty of Khotyn was signed on 9 October 1621 which resulted in no territorial gain or loss, but Sigismund was to relinquish his claims on Moldavia and the Ottoman Empire was prevented from marching into Poland. Sultan Osman himself was not fully satisfied with the war's outcome and blamed the defiant janissaries. His wish and plans to modernize the army, which was blamed for the defeat, were however opposed by the traditionalist janissary units. That opposition resulted in the 1622 rebellion in which Osman II was deposed and strangled.

Polish–Swedish War (1626–1629)

Following a series of conflicts between Poland and Sweden in 1600–1611, 1617–1618, and 1621–1625, all of which ended in a stalemate, Gustavus Adolphus invaded in 1626 to gain control over Livonia and relinquish Sigismund's claim to the Swedish crown. Sigismund, already in advanced age, continued his long-term ambition to seize Sweden, which gave Gustavus Adolphus a reasonable casus belli and justification for war. Though the Polish army achieved major victories in the previous battles against Sweden, particularly at Kircholm in 1605, the very end proved to be catastrophic.

The first skirmish took place in January 1626 near Wallhof, in present-day Latvia, where the Swedish army of 4,900 men ambushed a Polish force of 2,000 men commanded by Jan Stanisław Sapieha, son of Lew Sapieha. Polish casualties were estimated at between 500 and 1,000 dead, wounded and captured. According to historians, the Polish-Lithuanian commander later suffered a nervous breakdown.

In May 1626 the Swedes entered Polish Ducal Prussia. Escorted by a fleet, a second Swedish army disembarked in July near the town of Piława (Pillau). The landings were a complete surprise to the Commonwealth's defences, and despite a relatively small Swedish force, Gustavus Adolphus quickly captured the coastal towns and cities, almost without a fight. Many of these were inhabited by Protestants who resisted the staunchly Catholic Sigismund and Polish domination of their lands; some towns opened their gates to the Protestant Swedish forces whom they portrayed as liberators. However, fortified Gdańsk (Danzig), which maintained its own standing army and a sizeable fleet, refused to surrender. Simultaneously, Sigismund received little to no support from his vassal George William of Brandenburg-Prussia, who, as a Calvinist, pledged neutrality in the conflict. Jędrzej Moraczewski described George's neutral stance to salvage his dukedom as "comical".

The Poles attempted to divert the Swedes from Gdańsk by deploying an army to fight at Gniew. The fighting continued for several days until 1 October, when Sigismund ordered the withdrawal of his troops, and called on reinforcements from around the country. The battle, despite a tactical victory for Sweden, was a strategic blow to Gustavus, who was subsequently unable to besiege Gdańsk. At Dirschau, in the summer of 1627, Gustavus Adolphus was seriously wounded and the Prussian campaign came to a halt. The wound forced the king to stay in bed until autumn, and his right arm was weakened with some fingers partially paralyzed. As the major trade ports on the coast of the Baltic Sea were blocked by Swedish vessels, Sigismund sent a small squadron of ten ships under Arend Dickmann to engage the Swedes at the Battle of Oliva. It was the largest naval battle fought by the Polish royal navy, which successfully defeated the enemy fleet and broke the Swedish blockade.

Although Poland emerged victorious in the final battle at Trzciana, Sigismund's exhausted camp accepted a peace offer. The Truce of Altmark signed on 26 September 1629 (16 September O.S.) granted Sweden the control of Livonia, though Prussia, Latgale and Dyneburg remained under Polish governance.

Assassination attempt

An unsuccessful attempt on the life of the King was made on 15 November 1620. It occurred on Sunday morning when the monarch and his entourage was to attend mass at St. John's Archcathedral in Warsaw.

Sigismund was to arrive by crossing the alley or passage that linked the Royal Castle with the temple. As the royal procession drew closer to the churchdoor, hidden in a nearby portal was petty nobleman Michał Piekarski, armed with a war axe. When the monarch reached the final steps, Piekarski leaped out and threw himself on the King, stabbing him twice, firstly in the back and then in the cheek, and striking him in the arm. However, he was not able to deliver a fatal blow due to the intervention of royal guardsmen as well as Court Marshal Łukasz Opaliński, who shielded the King. Concurrently, Prince Ladislaus wounded the assassin on the head with a sabre. Other accounts state that no guards were present; the cortege had a casual character and the assassin was most likely overpowered by the attendees.

Parishioners gathered around the pale and lifeless King, who collapsed to the ground after the incident. The guards and other attendants, among them Marcin Szyszkowski, were able to revive him and after a medical examination the wounds were found to be non-life-threatening. Chaos erupted when false rumours spread that the King had been murdered as his clothes were stained in blood. Initially, the townsfolk believed that the city was being attacked; the confusion arose when an Italian priest's cry traditore! (traitor) was misinterpreted as "Tatar".

The assassin was widely regarded as a mentally unstable melancholic, unrestrained in deeds. Piekarski's most probable cause for the assassination was fame and recognition; the successful assassination of Henry IV in Paris (1610) by François Ravaillac served as motivation for his actions. For the appropriate moment Piekarski waited patiently ten years. At his trial, he did not deny the crime he committed and heavily insulted the monarch, whilst blaming himself for the failed regicide. Piekarski was executed in a similar manner as Ravaillac on 27 November 1620 in Warsaw; he was publicly humiliated, tortured, and his body torn apart by horses. The dismembered remains were subsequently burned and their ashes scattered by a cannon.

Religion

The reign of Sigismund marked the beginning of religious persecution during the Counter-Reformation and the downfall of Protestantism in Poland–Lithuania. His hate towards Evangelicals coupled with the advice of Jesuit priests led to repressions and the eventual demise of the Polish Brethren decades later; their expulsion from Poland in 1658 contributed to the spread of Unitarianism across the globe. The Polish Reformed Church, once a thriving institution and community, began to fall. Akin actions were undertaken against other minorities in the country. Sigismund's contempt for Eastern Orthodoxy was equally strong; it was his initiative that the native Ruthenian peoples inhabiting the eastern lands of the Commonwealth be forcibly converted to Catholicism, which laid the foundation for the modern Ukrainian Greek Catholic Church. However, in Sweden the policies had an adverse effect; the Reformation in Northern Europe continued and anti-Catholic sentiment strengthened.

The discrimination further extended to Jews and Muslims (Tatars), whose rights were already restricted. The Warsaw Confederation of 1573 granted religious freedoms unlike elsewhere in Europe, but the degree to which those freedoms were guaranteed often varied. In 1588, Sigismund decreed that the "Israelites" and Tatars are forbidden by law to hold public office or assume political roles. Daily contact with Christians was to be limited and any attempts made at converting Christians to Judaism or Islam was punishable by death. Insubordinates were burned at the stake, or, in the case of Muslim men who married Christian women, beheaded. Circumcision of Christian children by Jews was made a capital offence. However, trade practices continued to thrive and Poland remained a safe haven for refugees fleeing oppression in other parts of the continent, chiefly during the Thirty Years' War.

Religious nepotism under Sigismund and in the years following his death was undoubtedly apparent – three of his sons, John Casimir, John Albert and Charles Ferdinand, were ordained as priests and held notable posts. Charles was appointed the bishop of Wrocław in 1625 and bishop of Płock in 1640. John Albert became bishop of Warmia at the age of nine in 1621 and cardinal-bishop of Kraków at the age of twenty in 1632. John Casimir, prior to his election to the throne, was made a cardinal at the behest of Pope Innocent X.

Death

Towards the end of his reign, Sigismund withdrew altogether from politics and devoted himself exclusively to family matters and his interests in performing arts. Little is known about the King's wellbeing at the time suggesting that he was in good health. However, in his last days he became bedridden due to gout and joint pain, an affliction which was likely inherited from his grandfather Sigismund the Old. His uncle, Sigismund II Augustus, also suffered from long-term arthritis.

Shortly after the unexpected death of his second wife, Constance, Sigismund fell dangerously ill and experienced mental problems, notably he was struck with severe depression. In November 1631, bishop Achacy Grochowski travelled to Warsaw and wrote "the monarch is of sound mind, his heart and stomach [abdomen] are healthy". Already in advanced age for the period, on Saint Catherine's Day (25 November) he appeared "cheerful, with a ruddy face, and in good spirit hoped to leave bed". Nevertheless, the gouty arthritis progressed and medics applied red-hot iron to the painful swelling with no effect. The king sensed that death is near and ordered an immediate assembly of nobles, which convened on 1 April. The so-called 'extraordinary parliament' (sejm ekstraordynaryjny) secured the candidacy and election of his son, Ladislaus, to the throne. On Easter Sunday he participated in final prayers, whilst being supported by his sons to prevent him from collapsing.

At eight in the morning on 25 April, Kasper Doenhoff, a courtier in charge of opening curtains in the royal bedchamber and greeting the monarch, did not hear a response. Unable to see at a distance he approached Sigismund whose face was paralyzed from a stroke. Hours later he briefly recovered his speech and murmured "there is no cure against the will [power] of death". The paralysis worsened and on 27 April Urszula Meyerin acted as spokeswoman, speaking on behalf of the mumbling king. Prince Ladislaus arrived on the same day. On 28 April, Sigismund's bed was surrounded by his courtiers and the Jesuit priests, who performed exorcism-like prayers. It was his wish that the court be witness to his demise, as interpreted in the words "vanitas vanitatis", Latin for 'all is vanity'.

After days of suffering, Sigismund passed away at Warsaw's Royal Castle at approximately 2:45 am (02:45) on 30 April 1632. His close aide Albrycht S. Radziwill wrote "the autopsy on the same day in the afternoon determined that the king's internal organs were healthy. He could have lived another twenty years". His embalmed body was placed in an elaborate tin coffin decorated with soldiers, battle scenes and musical motifs, a masterpiece of 17th-century tin-making. The coffin was interred inside the royal crypt at Wawel Cathedral in Kraków on 4 February 1633.

Legacy

Sigismund's death came at a time of great divisions and constant quarrels. His rule of nearly 45 years is perceived by some as controversial – it was distinguished by considerable developments in architecture, the arts and culture coupled with conspiracies, religious antipathy and the endless conflict with Sweden. Szymon Starowolski positioned Sigismund's legacy above that of his predecessors. Others were less flattering. The decision to appoint Jesuit priests as ministers on matters which did not necessarily concern religion caused ubiquitous disapproval. Spiteful foes convinced of the damage he inflicted on the nation wrote with contempt "this man, whose knowledge exceeded in goldsmithing but not politics, lived far too long". Members of opposing camps were relieved and enthusiastic to see his progressive son, Ladislaus, take the throne. Nonetheless, the nobility and magnates from all political spheres obeyed tradition by wearing black outfits for the duration of the interregnum as a sign of mourning. The strict compliance to the practice is said to have stunned foreign dignitaries. There is no doubt that Sigismund was one of Poland's most capable and recognisable sovereigns.

Sigismund's reign arguably marked an end to the Polish Golden Age and the dawn of the Silver Age. He presided over the transition from cultural Renaissance to the Baroque, and witnessed the first stages of a nationwide literary reform. Notably, it was under his rule that Polish began to supersede Latin in academic thought and artistic expression. Some ground-breaking achievements were made, for example, the publication of Jakub Wujek's Polish translation of the Holy Bible in 1599, which remained in use until the mid-20th century. The period also saw the rise of societal satire, parody and extensive political commentaries which reflected the country's faults in hope of improvement, such as the Eight sermons before the Sejm by Piotr Skarga. However, these works were considered controversial and dangerous to publish, particularly after the failed 1606 rebellion. Józef Szujski notes that the literature became "infested with pleonasms, pasquinades and moral sermon". Consequently, regional councils imposed censorship and suppression of speech. Renowned academician Joannes Broscius (Jan Brożek) wrote a satirical lampoon Gratis directed against the Jesuit priests, which was confiscated and burnt publicly in 1625. Exposed printers and distributors were tied to a pillory and flogged or beaten mercilessly.

Franciszek Siarczyński spoke of a cultural revolution that took place at the time and shaped Poland's society for the centuries to come. The simplicity and austerity of older Polish customs faded and were replaced in favour of those from Italy or Germany. Fabrics and garments diversified, thus becoming more striking; Siarczyński writes "clothing, once wool, adorned our sides, now silk, velvet, moire, gold and silver lining. Even a commoner frowns on sheepskin coats. Our coaches and carriages turned ostentatious. We no more venture to our neighbours and camp without the splendour". Jerzy Maternicki outlined that Sigismund was instrumental in developing mining in the Polish–Lithuanian Commonwealth.

The memory of Sigismund III is still vivid in Warsaw, which he expanded and made the capital of Poland in 1596. Władysław IV Vasa ordered the construction of a monument dedicated to his father in the heart of the city as a reminder of the 'Sigismundian' legacy. The engineers drew inspiration from the memorials of Ancient Rome, notably the Column of Phocas. The new 22-meter Corinthian column was crowned with a bronze statue of the king wearing armour, holding a cross and a sword. Władysław personally unveiled Sigismund's Column on 24 November 1644 as the first secular column in Europe's modern history.

Personal life

Scholars frequently noted Sigismund's extreme piety, with some calling him a fanatic even during his lifetime. Adherents, however, subtly described it as absolute devotion to religion and Roman Catholic observance, which especially drew praise from papal legates and foreign clerics who visited the court. According to Giovanni Paolo Mucante and cardinal Enrico Caetani who were sent by Pope Clement VIII, "Sigismund's behaviour was comparable to that of a priest. He fervently attends mass daily, then hears choral music, sermons and orations. He fasts, and practices sexual abstinence on Wednesdays and Fridays, two days before and after confession. This large kingdom would have no schismatics, Calvinists or Lutherans if it depended on him". Historian Paweł Fabisz writes that when James of England and Scotland sent a book with anti-papal connotations, Sigismund deemed the gift "vile" and threw it into the fireplace.

Throughout the entire reign Sigismund maintained high etiquette and courtliness. Mucante emphasized his frugality and calm nature. Nevertheless, he hosted balls and held masquerades during which he would entertain guests and play the harpsichord. The king was a skilled dancer and performed Polish folk dances as well as Italian dances like the saltarello and passamezzo. Upon the marriage to his first wife, Anne of Austria, on 25 November 1592 he ordered a themed masquerade on Kraków's Main Market Square and, to the disbelief of his subjects, danced for the public. Sigismund was also known to be physically active in his youth and enjoyed occasional hunting, ice skating and frequently played football; he is widely credited for introducing and popularising the sport in Poland. Members of the royal court disapproved of such activities which were perceived as improper and not worthy of a monarch, particularly the sports.

Sigismund's personal approach to internal affairs was unpredictable; he was said to have been somewhat temperamental and impetuous at times. Joachim Lelewel compared his character to that of the despotic Philip II of Spain, but unlike Philip who overtly ordered persecution of non-Catholics, Sigismund was more discrete. A determined and stubborn man who sought to strengthen his authority, he was reluctant to participate in pointless conferences. As recalled by his close aide Albrycht Radziwill, at one meeting the king decided to sketch an owl in his notepad rather than note important advice.

Sigismund held high regard for the arts and early Baroque architecture; he willingly sponsored foreign masters and engineers who came to Poland at his invitation. He actively took part in the designing of façades and structural elements as well as Eucharistic objects such as chalices, crucifixes, candelabra and even book covers. During a visit to the Lwów Bernardine Church in 1621 he reprimanded the chief planners for making the temple seem disproportionate. Sigismund was a gifted painter and craftsman; only a few of his works survive, among them parts of Saint Adalbert's silver reliquary at the Cathedral in Gniezno. He was also fascinated by alchemy and ancient methods of turning metals into gold; it is said he experimented with the alchemist and philosopher Michael Sendivogius.

Marriages and children

On 31 May 1592 Sigismund married his first wife Anne of Austria (1573–1598), daughter of Archduke Charles II of Austria and his wife Maria Anna of Bavaria. She was well received in Poland, despite being a Habsburg. Certain leading magnates were initially opposed to the marriage, however the opinion shifted in her favour due to personal characteristics; she was known to be attentive, sharp-minded, humble, pious and kind, though of poor health. The couple led a happy but introverted life. Anne was particularly hostile towards the Swedes; her attitude was shaped by an unsuccessful visit to Sweden in 1593 where she was said to have been mistreated. She complained of the cold and general misery in Sweden, and fell ill there in October 1593. The continuous stress arising from the unpredictable behaviour of Charles Vasa (future King Charles IX and adversary of Sigismund) also contributed to her distaste. According to an account, she gave birth in Stockholm to a baby girl named Catherine who died soon after and was secretly buried upon their return to Poland. Her health rapidly deteriorated with successive pregnancies over the next four years. She died from a puerperal fever at childbirth along with the baby boy on 10 February 1598 in Warsaw. Following her death, Sigismund was in deep mourning; he expressed sorrow in private letters to his mother-in-law Maria Anna of Bavaria, and isolated himself from subjects. Anne and Sigismund had five known children during their marriage:

 Anne Marie (23 May 1593 9 February 1600)
 Catherine (May 1594 June 1594)
 Ladislaus (9 June 1595 20 May 1648), reigned 1632–1648 as Władysław IV 
 Catherine (27 September 1596 June 1597)
 Christopher (10 February 1598)

Sigismund was expected to marry Anna of Tyrol in 1603, however Emperor Rudolf II did not give his consent. Instead, on 11 December 1605 he wedded Constance of Austria (1588–1631), Anne's younger sister. The match was condemned by nobles and clerics who previously opposed Anne and the Habsburg alliance; the match was savagely described as "incestuous". The death of Jan Zamoyski, leader of the opposition, in June 1605 allowed for the marriage to take place without incidents. Some threatened to abandon the royal court, notably Piotr Skarga. The marriage further fuelled the anger of Sigismund's most vocal adversaries, Nicholas Zebrzydowski. The wedding ceremony and Constance's entrance into Kraków was so ostentatious it was recorded in the form of a large gouache roll painting known as rolka sztokholmska, now housed in Sweden. Like her sister, Constance was well-educated and religious; she attended mass two to four times a day. She was also a good mother, who particularly cared for her stepson, Ladislaus, even in his twenties. On the other hand, Constance approved of her husband's struggle for absolute power; she maintained considerable influence over Sigismund and the senators. To the general public she appeared cold, strait-laced, intolerant and even antisemitic; in 1626, she forbade the Jews to settle in the town of Żywiec which she privately owned and administered. Under her patronage, Austro-German culture as well as Spanish fashion flourished at the court. Constance died on 10 July 1631 from a heat stroke she suffered after attending mass on the Feast of Corpus Christi weeks earlier. They had seven children:

 John Casimir (25 December 1607 14 January 1608)
 John Casimir (22 March 1609 16 December 1672), reigned 1648–1668 as John II Casimir
 John Albert (25 May 1612 22 December 1634)
 Charles Ferdinand (13 October 1613 9 May 1655)
 Alexander Charles (4 November 1614 19 November 1634)
 Anna Constance (26 January 1616 24 May 1616)
 Anna Catherine Constance (7 August 1619 8 October 1651), the first wife of Philip William, Elector Palatine.

Urszula Meyerin

The nature of the relationship between Sigismund and one of his trusted courtiers, Urszula Meyerin, has been continually questioned by Polish historians. Born in Munich as Ursula Gienger, she came to Poland with the cortège of future queen Anne in 1592. The king was said to have been infatuated with Urszula, who was known to be attractive and pious. Upon her arrival, she became involved in the affairs of state and was appointed chamberlain (ochmistrzyni in Polish) at the Queen's court. To emphasize her political role and importance, she adopted the Old German equivalent to the title of chamberlain, "Meyerin", as her sobriquet and official name. She devotedly assisted in raising the children and, with time, acted as their tutor.

Meyerin's position as grey eminence and influence on the royal couple made her immensely unpopular among the nobility. Consequently, she was compared to the Spanish Duke of Lerma, who ruled in the king's stead, and contemptuously described as "the king's mistress", "ravenous gold-digger", "minister in a skirt" or "Jesuit's bigotry". Sigismund's secretary Jan Szczęsny Herburt in his memoirs called her "an obscene favourite". However, it is unknown whether the relations between the two were physical.

Gallery

Ancestry

See also 

 History of Poland (1569–1795)
 History of Sweden (1523–1611)
 Unions of Sweden

Notes

References

Inline citations

Bibliography

Further reading

 Daniel Stone, The Polish Lithuanian State, 1386–1795 (University of Washington 2001).
 Janusz Tazbir: Historia kościoła katolickiego w Polsce 1460–1795. Warsaw: 1966, p. 91.
 Stanisław Rosik, Przemysław Wiszewski: Poczet polskich królów i książąt. p. 927.
 Stanisław Rosik, Przemysław Wiszewski, Poczet polskich królów i książąt, p. 929.
 Stanisław Rosik, Przemysław Wiszewski, Wielki Poczet polskich królów i książąt, Wrocław 2006, p. 923.
 Warszawa w latach 1526–1795, Warsaw 1984 , p. 13.

External links 

 

|-

|-

|-

1566 births
1632 deaths
Dethroned monarchs
16th-century Polish monarchs
17th-century Polish monarchs
16th-century Swedish monarchs
People from Strängnäs Municipality
Rulers of Finland
Polish Roman Catholics
Grand Dukes of Lithuania
House of Vasa
Knights of the Golden Fleece
Polish people of the Polish–Muscovite War (1605–1618)
Burials at Wawel Cathedral
People of the War against Sigismund
Sons of kings
Non-inheriting heirs presumptive